A John Daly is an alcoholic mixed drink consisting of lemonade, iced tea, and vodka, named after American golfer John Daly. It can also be made with lemonade and sweet tea vodka (a vodka infusion). The drink is an alcoholic version of the Arnold Palmer (also named after an American golfer). The name is a tongue-in-cheek nod to Daly's problems with alcohol abuse.

The drink was initially made popular at the Whiskey Creek Golf Course in Fort Myers, Florida, by bartender Daton Lewis during Daly's 2005 run at the Dirty Gator Open. Daly considered the use of his name without authorization to be trademark infringement. In response, Daly formed the GIASI Beverage Company in 2010 with two of his close friends. Daly is the majority share holder. GIASI stands for "Grip It And Sip It", a play on words of his "Grip it and Rip it" catch phrase. Bottled by Frank-Lin Distiller's in Fairfield, California, the official Original John Daly Cocktail came to market in 2013. Initial reach in California and Nevada has swept to 13 states including his home state of Arkansas, Texas and Illinois. GIASI offers three different flavors of the 30 proof ABV vodka-based 'READY TO DRINK' cocktail: sweet tea/lemonade, peach tea/lemonade, and raspberry tea/lemonade.

Variations
One variation is the Southern-Style John Daly, which includes bourbon and mint in place of the vodka.

P.F. Chang's serves a version using mango rum called a Spiked Lemon Tea.

See also

 List of lemonade topics

References

Cocktails with vodka
Blended tea
Cocktails with tea
Cocktails with lemonade